Palink is the operator of the "IKI" supermarket chain in Lithuania.

History 
Palink was founded by the brothers George, Oliver and Nicolas Ortiz. The first store was opened in 1992 in Vilnius, Lithuania.

In 2005, Palink opened its first store in Riga, Latvia.

In 2014, Palink sold all IKI stores in Latvia (51 stores) to local company Mego, stating that Palink is not interested in investing in Latvia anymore. IKI was 5th largest supermarket chain in Latvia.

The company currently operates over 240 "Iki", "Iki Cento" and "Iki Express" stores in more than 70 cities and is the second-largest retail grocer in Lithuania.

In 2016, the Iki Cento brand of stores was discontinued.

In mid-March 2018, Rimi Lietuva submitted nominations of potential buyers to the Competition Council. The council did not support them, on the grounds that these buyers "would not provide stable and at least as effective competition" as the current company provides until the transaction is implemented. In April, the Competition Council announced that the sale of Iki to Rimi was terminated.

In July 2018, the German company REWE increased its stake in Palink to 93.75% of the capital. The second owner was E. Leclerc group Unilec.

References

External links 

 

Supermarkets of Lithuania
Supermarkets of Latvia
Companies based in Vilnius
1992 establishments in Lithuania
Retail companies established in 1992
Lithuanian brands